Scarrittia is an extinct genus of hoofed mammal of the family Leontiniidae, native to South America during the Late Oligocene epoch (Deseadan in the SALMA classification).

Description 
 
It had three hoofed toes on each foot, and a very short tail. Due to a fused tibia and fibula, Scarrittia would have been unable to turn its legs sideways. The short skull had 44 poorly specialized teeth.

Natural history 
This was a very successful genus with various known species, such as Scarrittia robusta, S. barranquensis and S. canquelensis, which lived around 30 million years ago. They lived in moist forest, near the coast, in wetlands, lakes, swamps, etc. and they ate soft vegetation, grasses, fruits and trees. Some species were omnivorous, eating also eggs and small mammals. They were not adapted for running, though their large size meant they had few enemies.

Distribution 
Fossils of Scarrittia have been found in:
 Sarmiento Formation, Argentina
 Fray Bentos Formation, Uruguay

References 

Toxodonts
Oligocene mammals of South America
Deseadan
Oligocene Argentina
Fossils of Argentina
Oligocene Uruguay
Fossils of Uruguay
Fossil taxa described in 1934
Taxa named by George Gaylord Simpson
Prehistoric placental genera
Golfo San Jorge Basin
Paraná Basin
Sarmiento Formation
Paleogene Argentina